The AACTA Award for Outstanding Achievement in Television Screen Craft is a special discretionary award, presented by the Australian Academy of Cinema and Television Arts (AACTA) for achievements in television screen crafts, in fields excluding acting, direction, producing and screenwriting. The award was presented by the Australian Film Institute (AFI), from 2006 to 2010, at the Australian Film Institute Awards (known commonly as the AFI Awards).

In the following tables, from 2000 to 2006 winners are listed first, in boldface and highlighted in gold; those listed below the winner that are not in boldface or highlighted are the nominees; from 2007, onwards, the award was presented as a special award.

Winners and nominees (2000-2006)

Winners (2007-present)

See also
AACTA Awards

References

External links
The Australian Academy of Cinema and Television Arts Official website

Awards established in 2000
Short Film